Foreigner most commonly refers to:

 Alien (law), a person in a country who has fewer rights than a citizen or national
 Foreigner (band), a British-American rock band

It may also refer to:

Music
 Foreigner (Foreigner album), the 1977 debut album of the aforementioned band
 Foreigner (Cat Stevens album), 1973

Literature
 Foreigner (comics), a Marvel Comics villain
 Foreigner series, a science fiction series by  C. J. Cherryh, named after the first novel Foreigner
 Foreigner (Sawyer novel), a 1994 novel in the Quintaglio Ascension Trilogy by Robert J. Sawyer
 The Foreigner (novel), a 2008 novel by Francie Lin

Film and theatre
 The Foreigner (1921 film), an American silent film also known as God's Crucible 
 Foreigners (film), a 1972 Swedish film
 The Foreigner (2003 film), an action film starring Steven Seagal
 The Foreigner (2017 film), an action-thriller film starring Jackie Chan
 The Foreigner (play), a 1984 play by Larry Shue
 Foreigners, a play by Frederick Lonsdale

Journalism
 The Foreigner (newspaper), an online English-language newspaper in Norway

See also
 Foreigners' Street, a Chinese amusement park in Chongqing
 Stranger